István Maróthy (born 20 April 1943) is a Hungarian former wrestler who competed in the 1972 Summer Olympics.

References

External links 
 
 

1943 births
Living people
Olympic wrestlers of Hungary
Wrestlers at the 1972 Summer Olympics
Hungarian male sport wrestlers
20th-century Hungarian people